Short Eyes is a 1977 American film adaptation of Miguel Piñero's play of the same title, directed by Robert M. Young. It was filmed in the Manhattan House of Detention for Men, otherwise known as The Tombs.

The Wu-Tang Clan sampled dialogue from the film for the songs "Let My Niggas Live" and "Gravel Pit" in 2000.

Plot
Short Eyes is set in an unnamed prison in New York City, whose inmates are predominantly African American or Puerto Rican. One day, Clark Davis, a young, middle-class white man accused of raping a young girl, arrives on remand. His fellow prisoners immediately turn on him—child rapists are considered the lowest form of prison life—except for Juan, one of the institution's older prisoners, who treats him with dignity.

Davis insists he doesn't remember raping the girl, but he admits to Juan that he has molested several other children. The prosecution's case against Davis is weak and, unless Juan tells prison authorities about Davis' confessions to him, it is only a matter of time before he is set free. As Juan struggles with what to do, the other prisoners plan to get rid of Davis permanently.

Cast

Music
Curtis Mayfield wrote the film's score, and appears in the film as a prisoner performing the song "Do Do Wap Is Strong In Here".  The soundtrack was released on Mayfield's Curtom Records.

References

External links
 
 

1977 films
1977 drama films
American prison films
American films based on plays
American drama films
Films directed by Robert M. Young
Films about pedophilia
1977 directorial debut films
Films set in New York City
Films set in prison
Films shot in New York City
1970s English-language films
1970s American films